Cuckooland is the eighth studio album by jazz rock artist Robert Wyatt. It was released in 2003 on Hannibal Records. The artwork is by Alfreda Benge. The Wire named Cuckooland the record of the year in its annual critics' poll.

Track listing
All tracks composed by Robert Wyatt; except where indicated

"Just a Bit" – 5:09
"Old Europe" (Wyatt, Alfreda Benge) – 4:15
"Tom Hay's Fox" – 3:33
"Forest" (Wyatt, Alfreda Benge) – 7:55
"Beware" (Karen Mantler) – 5:09
"Cuckoo Madame" (Wyatt, Alfreda Benge) – 5:20
"Raining in My Heart" (Felice and Boudleaux Bryant)– 2:42
"Lullaby for Hamza/Silence" (Wyatt, Alfreda Benge) – 5:00
"Trickle Down" – 6:47
"Insensatez" (Vinicius de Moraes, Antônio Carlos Jobim) – 4:24
"Mister E" (Karen Mantler) – 4:20
"Lullaloop" (Alfreda Benge) – 2:59
"Life Is Sheep" (Karen Mantler) – 4:14
"Foreign Accents" – 3:48
"Brian the Fox" – 5:31
"La Ahada Yalam (No-One Knows) (Nizar Zreik)" – 4:16

Notes 

"Just a Bit" is dedicated to Richard Dawkins.

"Old Europe" is about Juliette Gréco and Miles Davis.

"Lullaby for Hamza" is followed by 30 seconds of silence, to provide in Wyatt's words, "A suitable place for those with tired ears to pause and resume listening later".

Personnel
Robert Wyatt - Percussion, Piano, Trumpet, Cornet, Cymbals, Drums, Keyboards, Vocals
Karen Mantler - Harmonica, Piano, Keyboards, Vocals
Phil Manzanera - Vocals
Alfreda Benge - Vocals
Brian Eno - Vocals
David Gilmour - Guitar on "Forest"
Paul Weller - Guitar
Annie Whitehead - Trombone
Gilad Atzmon - Alto, Soprano, and Tenor Saxophones, Clarinet, Flute
Jamie Johnson - Bass Guitar, Vocals
Yaron Stavi - Double Bass
Jennifer Maidman - Acoustic guitar, Accordion

References

Robert Wyatt albums
2003 albums
Rykodisc albums
Albums produced by Robert Wyatt